Mariano Sebastián Brau (born July 10, 1982 in Avellaneda, Argentina) is an Argentine former professional footballer who played as a defender.

Teams
 Arsenal de Sarandí 2003–2007
 Estudiantes Tecos 2007
 Arsenal de Sarandí 2007–2009
 All Boys 2010–2011
 Oriente Petrolero 2011–2016
 Royal Pari 2018–2020

Honours
Arsenal de Sarandí
 Copa Sudamericana: 2007
 Suruga Bank Championship: 2008

References
 
 

1982 births
Living people
Argentine people of French descent
Argentine footballers
Association football defenders
Argentine Primera División players
Arsenal de Sarandí footballers
All Boys footballers
Oriente Petrolero players
Royal Pari F.C. players
Argentine expatriate footballers
Argentine expatriate sportspeople in Bolivia
Expatriate footballers in Bolivia
Argentine expatriate sportspeople in Mexico
Expatriate footballers in Mexico
Sportspeople from Avellaneda